Adam Marušić (born 17 October 1992) is a Montenegrin professional footballer who plays as a right midfielder for Serie A club Lazio and the Montenegro national team.

Club career

Voždovac
Marušić made his senior debut with Voždovac in the third tier of the Serbian football pyramid. After two seasons in Voždovac, he made his debut in the SuperLiga. In the 2013–14 season, Marušić scored six goals and recorded three assists.

Kortrijk
On 18 June 2014, Marušić joined K.V. Kortrijk on a three-year contract, with his transfer costing €450,000. By the fall of 2014, he had already become a regular in Kortrijk's starting eleven. On 1 November 2014, Marušić scored two goals in Kortrijk's 4–0 win against Cercle Brugge.

Oostende
On 27 June 2016, Marušić signed a four-year contract with K.V. Oostende, with his transfer costing €900,000.

Lazio
On 1 July 2017, Marušić was signed on a five-year contract by Lazio. He scored his first goal for the club on 24 September, in a 3–0 away win over Hellas Verona.

In Lazio's financial report ending 31 December 2021, it was confirmed that Marušić had extended his contract with the club until 2024.

International career
Although Marušić was born in Belgrade, he accepted an invitation to play for the Montenegro national team. He made his debut for Montenegro on 27 March 2015, in a match against Russia which was suspended after Russian goalkeeper Igor Akinfeev was struck in the head by a flare.

On 1 September 2021, Marušić scored his first international goal in a 2022 FIFA World Cup qualifying draw against Turkey.

Career statistics

Club

International

International goals
Scores and results list Montenegro's goal tally first.

Honours
Lazio
 Coppa Italia: 2018–19
 Supercoppa Italiana: 2017, 2019

References

External links
 
 
 17 Марушић Адам
 Adam Marušić at jelenfootball.com

1992 births
Living people
Footballers from Belgrade
Serbian people of Montenegrin descent
Association football midfielders
Serbian footballers
Montenegrin footballers
Montenegro international footballers
FK Voždovac players
K.V. Kortrijk players
K.V. Oostende players
S.S. Lazio players
Serbian SuperLiga players
Belgian Pro League players
Serie A players
Montenegrin expatriate footballers
Expatriate footballers in Belgium
Montenegrin expatriate sportspeople in Belgium
Expatriate footballers in Italy
Montenegrin expatriate sportspeople in Italy